Pandora Reef is a low-lying island in addition to being an adjacent fringing reef. It is in Halifax Bay in Queensland, Australia.
The name Pandora Reef dates back to at least 1889.

The surrounding waters are in the Great Barrier Reef Marine Park in the Coral Sea.  The Great Barrier Reef Marine Park Authority designation is 18-051.  
Zoned as a Marine National Park, fishing is not permitted, although diving and photography are allowed.

Aerial photos and maps

See also 
Halifax Bay Wetlands National Park
Fly Island

References

Bibliography 

Islands of Queensland
Coral Sea Islands
Great Barrier Reef
Reefs of Australia